Vanchi Bhumi (alternatively Vanji Bhumi) was the national anthem of the erstwhile Kingdom of Travancore which now forms part of Kerala. It was formally known as the Vanchishamangalam meaning "Hail the Lord of Vanchi". It was played by the Travancore radio every night as the last item. 

Vanchi Bhumi, meaning the "Land of Vanchi", is a reference to the city of Thiruvanchikulam, Kodungallur the capital of the Later Cheras, and the "Lord of Vanchi", the Later Chera's tutelary deity, Vanchinathan, a name for Hindu god Shiva.

Written in Malayalam language, it was the anthem of the Kingdom of Travancore until 1947, and the merger of Kingdom of Travancore with India.

Lyrics

References

External links for Audio
Vancheesha Mangalam as recorded by the Travancore Government in 1938.
Audio of the Anthem.

Anthems of Indian states
Kingdom of Travancore
Year of song unknown
Songwriter unknown